"Hopelessly" is a pop song performed by English singer Rick Astley and written by Rob Fisher and Astley. It was produced by Gary Stevenson and Astley. The song was recorded for Astley's first album, Body & Soul (1993). It was released as the album's second and first single on 3 April 1993 by RCA Records. The single peaked at number 33 in the UK charts. It peaked at number 28 in the US and at number eight in Canada. It is still a recurrent play on most North America hot AC stations, given the fact that it was a hit single in that format (it reached #4 on Billboard's AC chart). It was featured in the compilation Reflections of Love. 

Astley retired shortly after the song's release, making "Hopelessly" the first single he would release (excluding the album's final single The Ones You Love) until 2001.

Track listing

Studio version
"Hopelessly" – 3:35
"When I Fall in Love" – 3:02
"Hold Me in Your Arms" – 4:24
"Whenever You Need Somebody" – 3:28
Live version
"Hopelessly" (Live, Recorded in Italy, September 1993) – 2:58
"Never Gonna Give You Up" – 3:32
"Together Forever" – 3:24
"She Wants to Dance with Me" – 3:15

Personnel 
 Rick Astley – vocals 
 Dave West – keyboards, bass, drum programming 
 Richard Cottle – electric piano 
 Jim Williams – classical guitar

Chart performance

Weekly charts

Year-end chart

References

Hopelessly single at Rickastley.co.uk

1990s ballads
1993 singles
1993 songs
Rick Astley songs
Pop ballads
Songs written by Rob Fisher (British musician)
Songs written by Rick Astley
RCA Records singles